Tyśmienica can refer to:

 the town of Tyśmienica, Lublin Voivodeship, Poland
 the Polish river Tyśmienica (Wieprz)
 the town of Tysmenytsia, Ukraine